Bride kidnapping is a practice of kidnapping a woman for marriage purposes in Kazakhstan. The consent to marry is often imposed by cultural considerations.

History
The custom of kidnapping the bride to marry her was rarely practiced in Kazakhstan. This did not mean the possibility of a free choice of a partner; usually marriages were arranged and the woman's family received a dowry for her. Under the common law of Kazakhs, it was possible to kidnap a woman with her consent, especially when the man's family was too poor to pay a dowry. However, in the post-Soviet times, kidnapping of women intensified not only without consent, but often by men completely unknown to them. After the "fiancée" is brought home, she is encouraged by the man's mother or grandmother to put on a white headscarf, which is a symbol of consent to the wedding, and then to write a letter to her parents in which she agrees to marry. The letter is then forwarded to the parents who visit the daughter and ask for confirmation.

The number of kidnappings is increasing in the southern parts of Kazakhstan. They are divided into two types: kidnapping without the consent of the woman (kelisimsiz alyp qashu) and voluntary kidnapping (kelissimmen alyp qashu). According to the Criminal Code of Kazakhstan, kidnapping can be sentenced to 10 to 15 years imprisonment. However, if the kidnapper voluntarily surrenders the abductee, he is released from criminal liability.

Cultural conditions
A kidnapped woman, even if she escapes, is stigmatized in her village. In the Islamic tradition, according to which a girl must keep her virginity until marriage, she cannot spend the night at another man's house if he is not her father or brother, which would put her virginity in doubt. Thus, her only social option is to escape the kidnapper's house before dark or agree to marry.

In popular culture
In 2004, Peter Lom made a documentary called Ala Kachuu; Bride Kidnapping. The director earned a doctorate in political philosophy from Harvard and an associate professor at the George Soros Central European University in the defense of human rights and philosophy. Since 2003, he has been a freelance director of documentaries devoted to the defense of human rights.

References

Kazakhstani culture